Romanian architecture is very diverse, including medieval, pre-World War I, interwar, postwar, and contemporary 21st century architecture. In Romania, there are also regional differences with regard to architectural styles. Architecture, as the rest of the arts, was highly influenced by the socio-economic context and by the historical situation. For example, during the reign of King Carol I (1866–1914), Romania was in a continuous state of reorganization and modernization. In consequence, most of the architecture was designed by architects trained in Western European academies, particularly the École des Beaux-Arts, and a big part of the downtowns of the Romanian Old Kingdom were built during this period.

Peasant

From the middle ages to the early 20th century, in Romania there were two types of construction that developed in parallel and different in point of both materials and technique. The first is peasant architecture, whose most spectacular achievements were the wooden churches, especially those in the villages of Maramureș, Banat and Apuseni Mountains, where the tradition is still carried out today. In Maramureș, in Surdești village, the 54 m high church tower built during 1721–1724 is among the highest of this kind in Europe. The second consists mainly of monasteries, as well as princely seats or boyar mansions. Most of the old lay edifices were destroyed by time, wars, earthquakes and fires.

Romanian peasant architecture was produced using perishable materials and simple techniques. Certain historical, social-economic and geographic factors led to it becoming different depending on regions and eras. In general, a peasant house was made of 2, 3 or 4 rooms, each having a particular purpose. The most important room was the one in which the family spent their everyday life, often also called «cameră a focului» (fire room), because here is the stove. Another chamber is known as «tindă», most often used for passing. A room for keeping food and clothes is placed in different positions, sometimes having separate entry, or even being an independent structure. The 4th room, when it existed, was «camera curată» (the clean room), furnished and decorated in a special way. Used only for guests, it was used for storing valuable goods or the girls' dowry. The porch (prispă) appears quite often in the plan of popular Romanian dwellings. Because of the surrounding forests, peasant architecture develops mainly in wood. Primarily oak and fir, rarely beech and birch, were the main building materials, many times the only ones, which Romanian peasants used for building dwellings. Something that really influenced the exterior of a house was the roof, which was highly influenced both by existing materials and the climate of the region where it was built. At the beginning, it was exclusively made of long rye or wheat straws, or of reed in the swamp regions. Over time, towards the 17th and 18th centuries, the straws are replaced with shingle, very often set with wooden nails. Tiles and metal sheets appear quite late, being more expensive and harder to find materials.

Medieval 

All over Europe, the beginnings of the Middle Ages are marked by the decline of the urban life that characterized the Roman Empire. In Western Europe, the cities that survive are those with political or administrative functions. Unlike how it is in Western Europe, in the Romanian areas, after the end of the Roman structures, urban life completely disappears. Romanian cities develop differently in Wallachia and Moldavia compared to the Western ones, including those from Transylvania, being more of some big villages than cities.

In mediaeval architecture, influences of Western trends can be traced, to a greater or lesser extent, in all the three lands inhabited by Romanians. Such influences are stronger in Transylvania, and weaker in Moldavia, in forms absorbed by local and Byzantine tradition. In Wallachia, Western elements in architecture were even fewer; there, from the 14th-century architecture was based on the local adaptation of the Byzantine model (the Princely Church in Curtea de Arges and the Cozia Monastery).

There are monuments significant for the Transylvanian Gothic style preserved to this day, in spite of all alterations, such as the Black Church in Brașov (14th and 15th centuries) and a number of other cathedrals, as well as the Bran Castle in Brașov County (14th century), the Hunyad Castle in Hunedoara (15th century).

Transylvania also developed fortified towns extensively during the Middle Ages; their urban growth respected principles of functionality (the usual pattern is a central market place with a church, narrow streets with sides linked here and there by archways): the cities of Sighișoara, Sibiu and Brașov are remarkable examples in that sense. Building greatly developed in Moldavia, too. A great number of fortresses were built or rebuilt during the reign of Moldavia's greatest prince, Stephen the Great (1457–1504). Suceava, Neamț, Hotin, Soroca and others were raised and successfully withstood the sieges laid in the course of time by Sultan Mehmet II, the conqueror of Constantinople .
 
It was during his time that the Moldavian style, of great originality and stylistic unity, developed, by blending Gothic elements with the Byzantine structure specific to the churches. Among such constructions, the monumental church of the Neamț Monastery served, for more than a century, as a model for Moldavian churches and monasteries. The style was continued in the 16th century, during the rule of Stephen the Great's son, Petru Rareș (1527–1538, 1541–1546). The main innovation was the porch and the outwall paintings (the churches of Voroneț, Sucevița, Moldovița monasteries). These churches of Northern Moldavia have become famous worldwide, due to the beauty of their painted elegant shapes that can be seen from afar.

Renaissance 

In Moldavia, some buildings have Renaissance influences. The facade of the Golia Monastery Church is decorated with Corinthian pilasters, and the windows have pediments above them. The Saint Demetrius of Thessaloniki Church in Suceava has a relief with the coat of arms of Moldavia in a laurel wreath hold by two cherubs (aka putti), above the pisanie. Some boyar houses and certain tomb stones were also influenced by Renaissance architecture.

17th and 18th centuries

The 17th century, the zenith of the pre-modern Romanian civilisation, brought about a more significant development of outstanding lay constructions (elegant boyard mansions or sumptuous princely palaces in Moldavia and Wallachia), as well as the expansion of great monasteries. The latter were endowed with schools, art workshops, printing presses, and they were significant cultural centres. To this period belongs the church of the Trei Ierarhi Monastery in Iaşi, raised in 1635–1639, a unique monument due to its lavish decoration with carved geometric motifs, coloured in lapis lazuli and golden foil, all over the facades. The architectural style developed in Wallachia, especially under the reigns of Matei Basarab (1632–1654) and Constantin Brâncoveanu (1688–1714), is of a remarkable stylistic unity. The Brancovan style is characterized by integration of Baroque and Oriental features into the local tradition. Some examples are the Hurezi Monastery in Oltenia or the princely palace of Mogoșoaia, both of which are lavishly decorated, with beautiful stone carvings, stucco work and paintings.

The Phanariote period (1711/1716-1821)

The Phanariots were members of the Greek aristocratic families, who lived in the Fener quarter of Istanbul (Turkey). Some members of these families, who had gained great political influence and considerable fortunes during the 17th century, held very important administrative positions in the Ottoman Empire. Starting 1711 in Moldavia and in 1716 in Walachia, some Phanariots were put as rulers by the Ottoman Empire of these two regions. During the 18th century, there was no big break from the Brâncovenesc style, Phanariote architecture being more or less similar with the one before it. Changes and transitions took place quite slowly, noticeable only when comparing the situations between which there are differences of decades, like the beginning vs the late 18th century.

Early and mid 19th century (1821-1859)

In the first half of the 19th century, urban life grew considerably and there was a Western-oriented modernization policy. During this century, the predominant style was Classicism which lasted for a long time, until the 20th century, although it coexisted in some short periods with other styles. Foreign architects and engineers were invited here since the first decade of the 19th century. Most of the architects that built during the beginning of the century were foreigners because Romanians didn't have yet the instruction needed for designing buildings that were very different compared to the Romanian tradition. Usually using Classicism, they start building together with Romanian artisans, usually prepared in foreign schools or academies. Romanian architects study in Western European schools as well. One example is Alexandru Orăscu, one of the representatives of Neoclassicism in Romania.

Classicism manifested both in religious and secular architecture. A good example of secular architecture is the Știrbei Palace on Calea Victoriei (Bucharest), built around the year 1835, after the plans of French architect Michel Sanjouand. It received a new level in 1882, designed by Austrian architect Joseph Hartmann

The Cuza period (1859-1866)

During the reign of Alexandru Ioan Cuza between 1859 and 1866, Neoclassicism and a form Gothic Revival (known as Local/Wallachian Gothic Revival) were the dominant styles. Buildings from this period are quite rare, most of the city centres from the Old Kingdom being primarily built between 1866 and 1914, during the reign of king Carol I of Romania, who ruled Romania after the abdication of Cuza.

During the mid and late 19th century, the Gothic Revival style appears in Romania too, as a manifestation of Romanticism. In general, Romanticist artists, not just architects, saw the Middle Ages as a fantastical era. Thus, the adoption of Gothic Revival architecture seems very normal for Romanticists in Western Europe. This isn't the case for Romanticists in Russia and in Romania. However, the Gothic Revival style spread here too, good examples of this style being the Cezar Librecht House and the Niculescu-Dorobanțu Mansion in Bucharest, but also the Palace of Culture in Iași.

The Belle Époque (1877–1916) 

More buildings are built during the second half of the 19th century and the first decades of the 20th, as the creation of the new modern Romanian state, after the Unification of Moldavia and Wallachia in 1859, needed new administrative, social-economic and cultural institutions. This way, during a relatively short period, some administrative palaces had to be built, not just the governmental ones, but also smaller communal palaces in different cities, and also private homes. Many of them were built in the Classicist style, like the Romanian Athenaeum on Calea Victoriei (Bucharest).

Towards the end of the century, many administrative buildings and private homes are built in a style known as «Beaux-Arts» or «Eclectic», brought from France through French architects who came here for work in Romania, schooled in France. The National Bank of Romania Palace on Strada Lipscani, built between 1883 and 1885 is a good example of this style, decorated not just with columns (mainly Ionic), but also with allegorical statues placed in niches, that depict Agriculture, Industry, Commerce and Justice. Because of the popularity of this style, it changed the way Bucharest looks, making it similar in some way with Paris, which led to Bucharest being seen as "Little Paris". Eclecticism was very popular not just in Bucharest and Iași, the two biggest cities, but also in smaller ones like Craiova, Caracal, Râmnicu Vâlcea, Pitești, Ploiești, Buzău, Botoșani, Piatra Neamț etc. This style was used not only for administrative palaces and big houses of wealthy people, but also for middle-class homes.

Industrialization brought some engineering feats such as the King Carol I Bridge (later renamed Anghel Saligny Bridge). Built between 1890 and 1895 in over the Danube, when it was completed it then became the longest bridge in Europe and the third in the world.

Residential architecture

Besides administrative buildings and the residences of wealthy people, many city-houses with a street facade and a garden were also built, belonging to middle and upper middle class individuals, like doctors, engineers, architects or workers. Most of these houses have two or three window on the street facade, and the door and other windows on the garden facade. The room with the windows towards the street was in most cases the living room, so the people who happened to walk on that street could see how good the owners lived. The terrains of these proprieties were divided usually more or less equally into the garden and house surfaces. Above the entrance, some of them have monograms and/or cartouches with the year when they were erected. Most of the houses have their door in the garden, not towards the street, because during the Belle Époque there was a law that made owners who had doors at the street pay higher taxes.

Most if not all rich people of the Belle Époque and the interwar period had servants who lived with them on their property. They lived in a different part of the house, or had a separate structure in the garden, similar with the house but smaller. These separate structures were in most cases in the back of the garden, usually having common walls with the house of the neighbours. In the case of old houses from the 1st half of the 19th century or even from the Phanariote period (1711/1716-1821), which had huge gardens, the owners built a new bigger one for them in the Belle Époque, and gave the old one to the servants, as it is the case of Strada Negustori no. 4 in Bucharest.

Details and ornaments

Belle Époque architecture is characterized by complex details on the facades, and also more or less in the interiors, especially when it comes to the houses of wealthy individuals. Besides its practical purpose, a facade also had to be beautiful, since they were at that time a social status indicator. Thus, it could be said that streets with buildings from the Belle Époque are a sort of art galleries. Almost all of the ornaments that decorate these facades are made of plaster, produced with moulds, instead of being carved in stone. Craftsmen and sculptors who worked with plaster started to come in big numbers in Romania at the end of the 18th century. According to the documents that we have, the first house in Bucharest that was adorned with plaster decorations was the one of Dinicu Golescu, built in 1820. Exterior painted ornaments are quite rare, since they tend to degrade quicker than the sculpted ones. A material used for Romanian Revival facades were ceramic tiles, usually in bright colours.

Most houses have oval frame-like ornaments, called cartouches, in which sometimes it is written the year when a building was erected, or the initials of its owner. This is especially helpful because these inscriptions show clearly when something was built, a date otherwise unknown. They are usually located on the upper part of the facade, above the entrance door or in the pediment above the entrance. Especially in the interwar period, little plaques with the names of the architect and/or engineer started to be popular on the facades of villas, apartment and administrative buildings. All of these texts are almost always written with fonts that fit with the style of the building.

Besides simple linear moldings and Greco-Roman ornaments, most of the motifs used for decorating Neoclassical and Beaux Arts architecture consist of foliage, flowers, garlands (aka festoons) and vegetal spirals (aka rinceaux). Human figures were not rare, usually appearing under the form of mascarons (literally face-shaped ornaments) at the top of windows, doors or in cartouches. There were also medallions showing people from profile, but these were quite rare. Another form of human representation were putti (aka cherubs), which were basically cubby winged baby angels.

Generally, a Belle Époque house has a monumental entrance in their garden, done for impressing the guests the owners might have. In the case of houses from the 1880s and 1890s, the door is usually placed between two columns and has a pediment above, like a miniature of an Ancient Greek or Roman temple entrance. Despite being a detail, the handles of doors can have intricate details and shapes. Interior doors were simpler, and sometimes featured painted arabesques, like in the case of Strada Italiană no. 21 in Bucharest. Interior doors often had clusters of ornaments at the top, or a big cartouche with a painting inside. Entrances tend to have shell-shaped glass and metal awnings on the exterior, for protecting the door from weather, but also to make the entrance more monumental. Some entrances also had small green house-like rooms, with glass walls. Some bourgeois houses have porte-cochères, relatively rare, mostly in Bucharest.

Interiors are decorated with stuccos. They usually have decorated cornices at the edge where the walls intersect with the ceiling, and cartouches or medallions in the corners. Houses of rich people usually had painted ceilings. The room with the most opulent decoration was always the living room and/or the guest room. This was obviously for impressing the guests, similarly with how we put today pictures with our wins on social media to impress others. Walls were simpler than the ceiling, divided into geometric panels in the Louis XVI style, adorned with pilasters, or completely blank. Most interiors also had tiled stoved for warming the house. Most of them were completely white, like the ones from the Dimitrie Sturdza House in Bucharest. Fireplaces were relatively rare, most of them in the residences of wealthy individuals, palaces or state institutions.

Demolitions

During the reign of Carol I, due to the need for new headquarters for state institutions, some heritage buildings were demolished. This was mainly because back then, the idea of historic monument didn't exist. Thus, landmarks that were a few centuries old were turned down too make space for new buildings. In downtown Bucharest, multiple monasteries, churches and inns from the late Romanian Middle Ages or the Early Modern Period were demolished.

Art Nouveau

Art Nouveau appears in Romania during the same years as it does in Western Europe (early 1890s until the outbreak of World War I in 1914), but here few are the buildings in this style, the Beaux Arts being predominant. The most famous of them is the Constanța Casino. Most of the Romanian examples of Art Nouveau architecture are actually mixes of Beaux Arts and Art Nouveau, like the Romulus Porescu House or house no. 61 on Strada Vasile Lascăr, both in Bucharest. This is because the style was somewhat illegal in Romanian architecture, due to being popular in Transilvania, part of the Austro-Hungarian Empire at that time, where Romanians were suppressed and discriminated, despite being the majority of the population. So, the people who wanted an Art Nouveau home in the 1900s and early 1910s could only put some subtile ornaments reminiscent of the style, while the rest was completely Beaux Arts or in some rare cases Romanian Revival. An example of this is the Fanny and Isac Popper House in Bucharest (Strada Sfinților no. 1), 1914, by Alfred Popper, which is primarily in the Beaux Arts academic style, but has some Art Nouveau reliefs of women dancing and playing musical instruments at the bases of the two pilasters and flowers above the arch door. A frequent feature reminiscent of the style are the arch windows which have curvy woodwork elements. However, this window feature may not necessarily be Art Nouveau, since Beaux Arts and Rococo Revival architecture tends to use curvy and sinuous lines, especially during the 1890s, 1900s and 1910s.

Just like in the rest of Europe, the movement was not limited only to architecture, manifesting  in design, illustration, painting, and other art media too. A good example is the Ileana magazine, that belonged to the society with the same name created by Ștefan Luchian, Constantin Artachino and Nicolae Vermont. Its pages were decorated with illustrations similar with Alphonse Mucha's posters.

The national or Romanian Revival style

During the 1890s and 1900s, the Romanian Revival style appears and is developed. Ion Mincu, who studied at the École des Beaux-Arts from where in 1884 receives his architect diploma, is the first Romanian architect who, rejecting the Beaux-Arts style, promotes traditional Romanian architecture. Although thought in foreign schools and academies, other Romanian architects, like Petre Antonescu or Cristofi Cerchez, start building in this style. Romanian Revival buildings are erected both before and after WW1, the 1920s being the peak of popularity of the style.

Between the wars - Romanian Revival, Moorish, Art Deco and Modernism (1918–1940)

The interwar period and the WW2 one was dominated by two styles: Romanian Revival and Modernism (under the forms of Art Deco, Stripped Classicism and later Bauhaus). Before becoming mainstream, Modernism was in a conflict with the adepts of the Romanian Revival style. They blamed Modernists for lacking a National spirit. However, this opposition will fade away over time, as Modernism became the dominant style.

Another style of the interwar period was Rationalism, very similar with the architecture from Mussolini's Italy and Hitler's Germany. Buildings in this style are quite rare, most of them being institutions, like the Victoria Palace or the Carol I National Defence University, both in Bucharest. During the 1930s, the Moorish style was popular for houses, using Romanesque, Gothic and Renaissance elements, and big plane surfaces.

Many impressive villas that show these styles can be found in the Aviatorilor neighborhood in Bucharest, due to the fact that this area was empty before 1911. Another district with similar opulent villas is Cotroceni.

During the Belle Époque and the interwar period, it was very important for people to have houses fashionable with the preferences and the styles of the time. Because of this, some houses from the reign of Carol I were modernized, due to the fact that styles like Gothic Revival, Neoclassicism, Beaux-Arts or Art Nouveau were considered very "passé", "dated" or "out of fashion". This didn't happed often, and examples of 19th century buildings whose facades were changed with something Art Deco or Modern are relatively rare. They are relatively easy to spot, due to their proportions and sizes being the same as the rest of the Belle Époque houses.

Because of this perception of pre-WW1 architecture as "dated", some impressive buildings from that time were demolished. One of the best examples is the Marghiloman House, that stood where the ARO Building on Bulevardul Gheorghe Magheru is now in Bucharest. This is also due to the fact that the idea of historic monument didn't exist at that time.

Art Deco

Art Deco was a type of modernism which appeared in France as a style of luxury and modernity, highly associated with the Roaring 20s. It was present in Romania during the entire interwar period, creating a "luxurious and exuberant architecture, representative for the capitalist success", according to Ana Maria Zahariade. This style was used for administrative buildings, small apartment blocks of a few levels, and urban villas.

The movement had three phases: early, mature and late. The buildings of the 1920s and early 1930s are compositionally and stylistically similar with the Beaux-Arts ones from the 1900s and 1910s, but highly stylized and with a refined geometry. Pilasters and other Classical elements are used during this decade, but geometrized, together with simple floral motifs and abstract ornaments. An example of early Art Deco is the Central Social Insurance Company Building (now the Asirom Building) on Bulevardul Carol I, Bucharest, by Ion Ionescu, 1930s. Mature Art Deco, highly associated with the 1930s, was more modern and exuberant compared to the early form. Stepped setbacks are a key feature of this period. An example of mature Art Deco is Bulevardul Dacia no. 66, Bucharest, by Jean Monda, 1930s. Late Art Deco, from the late 1930s and the 1940s, paves the way for the International Style, but without completely abandoning ornamentation. Facades with 90° angle corners and decorated minimally only with simple cornices or each level are key features of this phase. However, this doesn't mean that these buildings are banal or dull. Materials of bright colours were used inside, especially marble and granite, and the exteriors usually had lightning rods. An example of late Art Deco is Piața Sfântul Ștefan no. 1, Bucharest, unknown architect, 1930s. At the same time, Streamline Moderne becomes popular in Romania, characterized by rounded corners and overall dynamism. An example of Romanian Streamline Moderne is the Moscovici Building (Strada Nicolae Iorga no. 22), Bucharest, by Aurel Focșanu and Emil Vițeanu, 1930s. Regardless of phase, Romanian Art Deco architecture is characterized by quality and more or less elegance through simplicity. Planned obsolescence is completely absent here.

Some of the best surviving examples of Art Deco are cinemas built in the 1920s and 1930s. The Art Deco period coincided with the conversion of silent films to sound, and movie companies built large display destinations in major cities to capture the huge audience that came to see movies. In Bucharest, the Regina Elisabeta Boulevard becomes a genuine film avenue, with its seven Art Deco cinemas. Soon, more movie theatres are built on the Gheroghe Magheru and Nicolae Bălcescu Boulevards and on Calea Victoriei in Bucharest. Besides cinemas, Romanian Art Deco also manifested through hotels, like Union (Strada Ion Câmpineanu no. 11, by Arghir Culina, 1929–1931), described as "the most beautiful and elegant hotel in the country". A real estate boom happens in the 1930s, when many small apartment blocks of a few stories are erected. Besides buildings, Art Deco monuments also appear, like the Monument to the Heroes of the Air on Bulevardul Aviatorilor, or the Zodiac Fountain at the main entrance of the Carol Park, both in Bucharest.

Late Art Deco 

During the 1930s and 1940s, Bauhaus Modernist ideas appear in Romanian architecture under the form of late Art Deco, very popular among young architects and the progressive bourgeoisie. Reinforced concrete apartment blocks and houses were built, made up of basic shapes, with horizontal or corner windows, usually with no symmetry. A typology of apartment blocks are the symmetrical U-shaped ones with courtyards. Important architects that built without decorating their buildings, similar with the International Style, include Horia Creangă, Duiliu Marcu, Octav Doicescu and Grigore Ionescu. Chronologically, the first architect that adopted without restraints Modernism was Marcel Iancu, who also designed some Cubist villas.

When Modernism entered the mainstream in the interwar period, the conservatives were initially horrified by the basic shapes, the simple lines, the lack of ornamentation and the austere look of the new buildings. Horia Creangă, the creator of some of the most iconic interwar Modernist buildings was nicknamed the "aristocrat of simple lines". Marcel Iancu wrote the reaction of some people towards the Fuchs Villa, the first Modernist house in Bucharest:

The 1930s represented a key decade of transformation of Bucharest. The period of popularity of Bauhaus Modernism intersects with intense modernizations of Bucharest from the interwar period, thus certain areas having a high density of tall Modernist buildings. Some good examples of this are the Gheorghe Magheru Boulevard and some parts of Calea Victoriei in Bucharest.

During World War II, architectural activity was very low. Some buildings that were started before the war, like the Victoria Palace in Bucharest, continued being built also during the war.

Moorish

A key style of the 1930s was the Moorish, aka Moorish-Florentine or Mediterranean Picturesque, which eclectically uses Romanesque, Gothic and Renaissance elements in civic architecture, with a Mediterranean vibe. It is also defined by big plane surfaces on the facades, with coarser or finer calcio-vecchio plaster textures. These abrasive plaster facades have proven over time to be durable. Another characteristic is simplicity, its ornamentation usually standing in window frames, doors and columns. Pantile was used for roofs and window cornices, both for decorative and practical reasons. These covering tiles are an important feature that gives buildings a Mediterranean air. Another important element of the style were loggias, with slender columns and simple of ogive arches. Wooden pergolas sometimes appeared, being usually added only for decorative reasons. Houses tend to have small ogive or arch windows and big rooms, giving them a mystical and mysterious vibe. Exteriors can look like fortresses or small castles. They also have big monumental fireplaces, similar with the ones in Hogwarts from the Harry Potter series. Interiors usually had Renaissance or Louis XIII style furniture which matches with the style of the home. Most Moorish buildings are urban villas, apartment buildings being somewhat rare.

The style is a local version of Spanish Colonial Revival and Mediterranean Revival architecture, popular in the first half of the 20th century in Coastal California and Florida. However, its origins and rise in Romania are not clear. One source could be Regionalist architecture of Mediterranean Europe. In Istoria Civilizației Românești: Perioada Interbelică (1918-1940) (the historian Ioan Scurtu stated that between the two World Wars, many Romanians came to the French Riviera. These vacations to the Mediterranean seaside (including the Greek one) may have contributed to the rise of the Mediterranean style in Romania. Another country which could have influenced architects who designed Moorish buildings is Italy. The cloister of the Monreale Cathedral in Monreale, Sicily, visited and drawn multiple times by Romanian architect George Simotta, is similar stilistically with 1930s Moorish architecture. Another origin of the style may have been Balchik, a Black Sea coastal town and seaside resort in the Southern Dobruja area of present-day northeastern Bulgaria. During the interwar period, it was part of Romania, and queen Marie of Romania started in 1925 the construction of a small summer palace. Later, writers like Jean Bart and Ion Pillat had residences in this area. Female architect Henrieta Delavrancea designed 20 villas here, in a style known as the "new Balchik" style.

Some architects rejected the style, like Constantin C. Moșchin, who criticizes its "decadence" in a 1935 article in the Arhitectura magazine. Another critical voice belonged to George Matei Cantacuzino, in an article entitled Mitocanul ca Factor al Civilizației Românești, published in the 1939 Simetria Magazine. There, he condemned the superficiality of a type client who was the product of a precarious education and research, who, "being informed only by the films he sees at the cinema, after exceedingly long meals and empty days, he would like his house to synthetise the décor of every romantic drama, where Mexican facades have Brâncovenesc elements, while Roman domes cover bathrooms and iconostases serve as bar tops for serving cocktails". During WW2, general Ion Antonescu, who had far-right and antisemitic views, disproves Moorish buildings, associating them with Jews. The end of WW2 is when the style truly disappears, with the rise of the Communist regime and Socialist realist architecture.

One of the most impressive examples of Moorish architecture is the Carol/Otto Gagel House on Strada Doctor Lister in Cotroceni, Bucharest, 1937, by Anton Curagea and Ion Giurgea, which shows its characteristics. Otto Gagel was the most famous bread and biscuit producer before WW1 and during the interwar period. He was also a provider of the Romanian Royal family, and had factories on the Arsenal Hill, which were demolished in the 1980s by the Nicolae Ceaușescu regime to make space for the Civic Centre.

The first "Blockhouses" 

This term of American origin refers to the buildings with multiple levels, built during the 1920s and 1930s, in various parts of the central area of Bucharest. The buildings of the Nicolae Bălcescu Boulevard in Bucharest are mostly of this type, good examples of Romanian Modernism. Due to the fact that there were no seismic precautions during the intrwar period, these blocks are dangerous when it comes to earthquakes. Because of this, today some of them have red circle stickers, highlighting the risk of crash.

The Communist period (1948–1989)

Socialist realism (1947–mid 1950s) 

From 1948, the new Communist regime - so-called people's democracy - began to have a big control over all aspects of life, including architecture, dictating a uniform bureaucratic vision of urbanism and architectural design. This is when interwar Bauhaus-like Modernism ends in Romania, being replaced by Socialist Realism, the style that characterizes 1930s' Moscow architecture. Due to the fact that Romania had to recover after the war, examples of Socialist Realist architecture are relatively rare. The style is more or less easy to spot, by its use of Neoclassical elements and proportions, but in a simplified way (not to be confused with Stripped Classicism, which was much more minimalistic). Gheorghe Gheorghiu-Dej was premier of the Socialist Republic of Romania from 1947 until 1965. He began the country's policies of industrialization, with infrastructure development for heavy industry, and construction for mass resettlement to new industrial and agricultural centers away from Bucharest and other principal cities.

During the Communist period, houses and apartment buildings built previously were nationalized. In 1950, with the Decree 92 of 19 April 1950, a huge number of private houses and lands are confiscated. Because of this, IAL (Întreprinderea de Administrare Locativă; the Enterprise of Locative Management) appeared, later renamed ICRAL (Întreprinderea de Construcții, Reparații și Administrare Locativă; the Enterprise for Building, Repairs, Locative Management). As the names suggest, this institution managed buildings, renovating them if necessary. Each nationalized building had a small metal tile with IAL and a unique code.

Postwar Modernism (1960-1980) 

Prior to the mid-1970s, Bucharest, as most other cities, was developed by expanding the city, especially towards the south, east, and west. High density dormitory neighbourhoods were built at the outskirts of the city. Due to these expansions, suburban villages and commune were administratively annexed by big cities. For example, in the case of Bucharest, during the 1950s, 1960s and 1970s, the Obor, Pantelimon, Berceni, Bucureștii Noi, Giurgiului, and Titan areas were newly incorporated into the city.

The Systematizations and Postmodernism (1977–1990 ) 

Nationalism, characterizing the last stage of Romanian communism, did not extend to contemporary Romanian architecture. Romanian Systematization was the program of urban planning carried out under the communist regime of Nicolae Ceauşescu (r. 1965–1989), after his 1971 visit to North Korea and China.  It forced projects, designed with an architecture of pre-fab technology, that resulted in the construction of high density dormitory neighborhoods, with huge housing blocks of numerous eight to ten-story buildings housing flats, that leveled core district cityscapes. The fast urban growth respected neither traditional rural values nor a positive ethic of urbanism.

Mass demolitions 

Traditional urban central areas and rural towns were destroyed in a process sarcastically dubbed Ceaușima. They were replaced by conglomerates of blocks of flats and industrial projects. His 'Food Complex' buildings, dubbed Hunger circuses, were identical large domed buildings intended as produce markets and food hypermarkets. Ceauşescu also imposed the erection of monumental public buildings, of a dull and eclectic classical solemnity.

The dominant example of the intrusion of Ceaușima egotism into the traditional urban fabric is the Centrul Civic (civic center) in the capital, with its grandiose and huge government palace built by Nicolae Ceauşescu, the 'Palace of the People' now post-revolution renamed the Palace of the Parliament. The civic district's construction necessitated the demolition of much of southern Bucharest beyond the Dâmboviţa River, with 18th and 19th century neighborhoods and their significant architectural masterpieces destroyed. The dominating government Palace is the world's largest civilian building with an administrative function, most expensive administrative building, and heaviest building. It and other edifices in the Centrul Civic are modern concrete buildings behind neoclassical quasi-fascist marble façades.

Contemporary (1989–present) 

The Romanian Revolution of 1989 ousted Nicolae Ceaușescu and Communist rule. The post-revolution Romanian culture has, in architecture and planning, been developing new concepts and plans for the country's needs of functionality and national aesthetics in an international context. Many modern 21st century buildings are mostly made of glass and steel. Another a trend  is to add modern wings and façades to historic buildings (for example the Headquarters of the Union of Romanian Architects building).

Examples of post-1989 architecture include: Bucharest Financial Plaza, Arena Națională, City Gate Towers, Bucharest Tower Center. Modern high rise residential buildings include the Asmita Gardens.

Heritage today

See also 

 Wooden churches of Maramureș
 List of Romanian architects
 List of buildings in Bucharest

Notes

References

External links 

 Romanian Architecture Gallery

 

ru:Румыния#Архитектура